
Hugo Höfl (16 June 1878 – 13 April 1957) was a German general during World War II. He was a recipient of the Knight's Cross of the Iron Cross of Nazi Germany.  Höfl retired from active duty in April 1943.

Awards
 Knight's Cross of the Iron Cross on 4 December 1941 as Generalleutnant and commander of 206. Infanterie-Division

References

Citations

Bibliography

 

1878 births
1957 deaths
Military personnel from Regensburg
People from the Kingdom of Bavaria
Lieutenant generals of the German Army (Wehrmacht)
German Army personnel of World War I
Military personnel from Bavaria
Recipients of the clasp to the Iron Cross, 1st class
Recipients of the Knight's Cross of the Iron Cross